The 1999 Illinois State Redbirds football team represented Illinois State University as a member of the Gateway Football Conference during the 1999 NCAA Division I-AA football season. Led by fourth-year head coach Todd Berry, the Redbirds compiled an overall record of 11–3 with a mark of 6–0 in conference play, winning the Gateway Football Conference title. Illinois State received an automatic bid to the NCAA Division I-AA Football Championship playoffs, where the Redbirds defeated Colgate in the first round and Hofstra in the quarterfinals before losing to Georgia Southern in the semifinals. Illinois State was ranked No. 3 in The Sports Network's postseason ranking of NCAA Division I-AA teams. The team played home games at Hancock Stadium in Normal, Illinois.

Schedule

References

Illinois State
Illinois State Redbirds football seasons
Missouri Valley Football Conference champion seasons
Illinois State Redbirds football